The following things are named after Donald Trump, an American television host, businessman, real estate developer, and 45th president of the United States.

Real estate 

Note: All current properties listed in bold are owned directly by Trump himself or the Trump Organization. The rest are associated with the Trump Organization through licensing deals, unless specifically noted otherwise.

Trump Tower

Current 
 Trump Tower, New York City
 Trump Towers, Sunny Isles Beach, Florida
 Trump Tower Kolkata, Kolkata, India
 Trump Tower Manila, Philippines
 Trump Towers Istanbul, Turkey
 Trump Towers Pune, India
 Trump Towers Mumbai, India

In development 
 Trump Towers Delhi NCR (Gurugram), India
 Trump Tower Punta del Este, Uruguay

Former 
 The Tower at City Place, White Plains, New York (De-branded in June 2022)

Cancelled or never completed 
 Trump Tower Moscow, Moscow, Russia
 Trump Tower, Tampa, Florida
 Trump Towers Rio, Rio de Janeiro, Brazil
Trump Towers Atlanta, Atlanta, Georgia, United States
Trump Tower Batumi, Batumi, Georgia 
Trump Tower Bangalore, Bangalore, India
Trump Tower Denver, Colorado, United States
Trump Tower Philadelphia, Pennsylvania, United States
Trump Towers Charlotte, North Carolina, United States
Trump Tower Dallas, Texas, United States
Trump Tower West Palm Beach, Florida, United States
Trump Tower Los Angeles, California, United States
Trump Tower Seattle, Washington, United States

Trump Plaza 

Trump Plaza is a brand of apartment buildings licensed to various proprietors.
 Trump Plaza (Jersey City)
 Trump Plaza (New Rochelle)
 Trump Plaza (New York City)

Former 
 The Plaza (West Palm Beach) (previously Trump Plaza until January 2021)

Other Trump buildings

Current 
 The Trump Building, in New York City
 Trump Bay Street, in Jersey City, New Jersey
 Trump Hollywood, a 41-story condominium tower in Hollywood, Florida
 Trump Parc and Trump Parc East, Manhattan
 Trump Park Avenue, Manhattan
 Trump Park Residences, Yorktown, New York
 Trump World Tower, in New York City
 Daewoo Trump World, apartment brand in South Korea

Former 
 The Dominick, a hotel condominium complex in New York City formerly called Trump SoHo (name licensing deal ended in 2017)
 Riverside South, Manhattan (Trump Place), Manhattan (de-branded in November 2016)
 Parc Stamford, a condominium building previously called Trump Parc Stamford.

Cancelled or never completed 
 Elite Tower, formerly known as Trump Plaza Tower, and Trump Elite Tower, Ramat Gan, Tel Aviv, Israel
 Trump condominium/hotel/office/shopping project, Charlotte, North Carolina. Announced in 2007; cancelled a year later, before the start of construction.
 Trump Hotel Rio de Janeiro
 Trump Las Olas Beach Resort, Fort Lauderdale, Florida, United States 
 Trump Ocean Resort Baja Mexico
 Trump on the Ocean, Jones Beach, New York
 Trump Tower Europe, a project by TD Trump Deutschland in Stuttgart, Germany
 Trump Twin Towers, a nickname for a proposed twin-towered skyscraper complex that would have replaced the original World Trade Center twin towers
Trump Offices Buenos Aires, an office project in Buenos Aires, Argentina

Hotels 
Note: Hotels listed in bold are owned directly by Trump himself or his company, the Trump Organization. The rest are associated through licensing deals.

Current 
 Trump International Hotel and Tower (Chicago)
 Trump International Hotel and Tower (Honolulu)
 Trump International Hotel and Tower (New York City)
 Trump International Hotel Las Vegas, a second tower was going to be built but was cancelled before construction started.

Former 
 The St. Regis Toronto (formerly Trump International Hotel and Tower (Toronto), divested in 2017)
 JW Marriott Panama (formerly Trump International Hotel & Tower (Panama City), licensing deal ended in 2018)
Paradox Hotel formerly called Trump International Hotel and Tower (Vancouver)
 Trump International Hotel Washington, D.C., also known as Old Post Office Building (sold and closed in 2022)

Cancelled or never completed 
 Trump International Hotel & Residence (Phoenix)
 Trump International Hotel and Tower (Baku)
 Trump International Hotel and Tower (Belgrade)
 Trump International Hotel and Tower (Dubai)
 Trump International Hotel and Tower (Fort Lauderdale)
 Trump International Hotel and Tower (New Orleans)
Trump Hotel Rio de Janeiro (Rio de Janeiro)
Trump International Hotel (Oman)

Golf courses

United States 

 Trump International Golf Club (West Palm Beach)
 Trump National Doral Miami (golf club + resort)
 Trump National Golf Club (Bedminster, New Jersey) – used as Trump's "Summer White House" during his presidency
 Trump National Golf Club (Charlotte, North Carolina)
 Trump National Golf Club (Colts Neck, New Jersey)
 Trump National Golf Club Hudson Valley (Hopewell Junction, New York)
 Trump National Golf Club (Jupiter, Florida)
 Trump National Golf Club (Los Angeles)
 Trump National Golf Club (Philadelphia)
 Trump National Golf Club (Washington, D.C.)
 Trump National Golf Club (Westchester, New York)
 Trump Golf Links (Ferry Point, New York)

International 
 Trump International Golf Club (Dubai)
 Trump World Golf Club (Dubai)
 Trump International Golf Links, Scotland
 Trump International Golf Links and Hotel Ireland
 Trump Turnberry (Scotland)

In development 
 Trump International Resort & Golf Club Bali (Golf Club + Resort + Residences)
 Trump International Resort & Golf Club Lido (Golf Club + Residences), West Java

Former 
 Trump International Golf Club Puerto Rico

Casinos 

Trump Entertainment Resorts was the casino arm of the Trump Organization. All of its casinos eventually went bankrupt or were divested.

Former 
 Trump Taj Mahal, a casino and hotel on the Atlantic City boardwalk (closed in 2016 and reopened in 2018 as Hard Rock Hotel & Casino Atlantic City)
 Trump Plaza Hotel and Casino, in Atlantic City. Initially a 50/50 partnership with Harrah's, then wholly owned by Trump since 1986. Closed in 2014 and demolished in 2021.
 Trump World's Fair at Trump Plaza in Atlantic City.  Operated with its own casino license in a wing of Trump Plaza. Closed in 1999 and demolished in 2000.
 Trump's Castle in Atlantic City (renamed Trump Marina in 1997), sold to Landry's, Inc. in 2011 who renamed it to Golden Nugget Atlantic City in 2011.
 Trump 29 Casino, in Coachella, California, now Spotlight 29 Casino. Former 50/50 partnership with the Twenty-Nine Palms Band of Mission Indians of California; Trump exited the business in 2006.
 Trump Casino in Gary, Indiana, later known as Majestic Star II. Closed in 2021.
 Trump Club Privee Casino, Canouan, Saint Vincent

Cancelled or never built 

 Trump Riverside North Casino and Hotel, St. Louis, United States
 Trump Motor City Casino and Hotel, Detroit, United States
 Trump Flamingo Casino, Kansas City, United States

Streets/roads/government buildings 

U.S.
 Donald J. Trump State Park, in New York state, located on land donated by Trump in 2006.
 Trump Drive – Kalispell, Montana
President Donald J. Trump Highway – a section of U.S. Route 287 in Oklahoma
 The Donald J. Trump Justice Complex – Lyon County, Nevada

International
 Trump Avenue – Ottawa, Ontario, Canada
 Donald J Trump Boulevard – Kamëz, Albania
 United States Square in honor of President Donald Trump (a.k.a. Donald Trump Square) – Jerusalem, Israel. A town square in the city surrounding the new U.S. embassy.  Named in honor of Trump for his administration's recognizing of Jerusalem as Israel's capital.
 Donald Trump Square – Petah Tikva, Israel
Note: Trump Street in the City of London, England is not named after Donald Trump or his family. It dates from the middle of the 18th century and is probably named after a former inn, the Trumpeter Tavern.

Planned 

  – A proposed train station near the Western Wall in the Old City of Jerusalem.
 Trump Heights – Golan Heights, a planned Israeli settlement in the Israeli-occupied territories, named in honor of Trump's recognition of the Golan Heights as part of Israel.

Arts and media

Games 
 Trump: The Game – a board game initially launched in 1989, with a 2004 re-release
 Donald Trump's Real Estate Tycoon – a 2002 video game by RedCap

Magazines 
Trump magazines include:
 Trump Style, a free magazine offered at Trump hotel-casinos from 1997 to 2002
 Trump World Magazine, published from 2002 to 2006
 Trump Magazine, published from 2006 to 2009

Social media 
 Trump Media & Technology Group (TMTG) — social media and technology company founded by Trump in 2021.

Food and drink

Current 
 Trump Winery, a vineyard in Virginia, acquired by Trump in 2011
 Trumptini, a Bacardi-based cocktail, and the signature cocktail of the Trump International Beach Resort in Miami, Florida

Former 
 Trump Footlong
 Trump Golden Ale now renamed Chinga Tu Pelo (literally “Fuck your hair”) beer
 Trump Ice, a water distribution company opened in 2004 and no longer served at Trump properties as of 2010.
 Trump Steaks
 Trump Vodka

Species 

 Neopalpa donaldtrumpi, a species of micro-moth with distinctive yellowish-white scales covering the head
 Tetragramma donaldtrumpi, a species of fossil sea urchin, a type of prickly bottom feeders.
 Dermophis donaldtrumpi, a proposed name for a putative new species of amphibian that is blind; not confirmed as a new species yet, nor published.

Other 

 Trump Force One – the nickname given by the media to Trump's personal aircraft, a Boeing 757-200ER. In December 2016 it received the callsign Tyson 1.
 Trumpy Bear – a stuffed teddy bear featuring a tuft of hair in the style of Trump's hairdo, and wearing a red tie

Satirical/Critical 
Items named after Trump in order to satirize or criticize him:
 Donald Trump baby balloon, a  balloon depicting Trump as a baby in a diaper with a mobile phone
 Dump Trump, a satirical statue
 Trump toilet paper, launched in Mexico in 2017 with the slogan "softness without borders"

Other ventures

Current 
 Trump Sales and Leasing (residential sales)
Trump International Realty (residential and commercial real estate brokerage firm)
Trump Restaurants (located in Trump Tower and consisting of Trump Buffet, Trump Catering, Trump Ice Cream Parlor, and Trump Bar)
Donald Trump, The Fragrance, released in 2004.
SUCCESS by Donald Trump (second fragrance launched by the Trump Organization and the Five Star Fragrance Company, released in March 2012)

Former 

 Donald J. Trump Foundation – charitable foundation shut down in 2018 due to legal issues
 Donald J. Trump Signature Collection, a line of menswear launched at Macy's in 2004, and involved in a lawsuit and subsequent trial. Discontinued in 2015, after comments Trump made about Mexican immigrants.
 GoTrump.com, a travel booking website
 Tour de Trump, a bicycle race held in 1989 and 1990.
 The Trump Network, a multi-level marketing company that sold vitamins
 Trump Office, a line of executive office chairs launched in 2007 for Staples Inc
 Trump University, owned mostly by Trump (renamed The Trump Entrepreneur Initiative in 2010)
Select By Trump (line of coffee drinks)
Trump Drinks (energy drink for the Israeli and Palestinian markets)
Trump Chocolate
Trump Home, an upscale furniture line
Trump Productions (television production company)
Trump Institute
Trump Model Management
Trump Shuttle, an airline
Trump Mortgage
Trump Steakhouse

See also 
 List of places named for George Washington
 List of places named for Thomas Jefferson
 List of places named for James Monroe
 List of places named for Andrew Jackson
 List of places named for James K. Polk
 List of things named after Ronald Reagan
 List of things named after George H. W. Bush
 List of things named after Bill Clinton
 List of things named after George W. Bush
 List of things named after Barack Obama
 List of things named after Joe Biden
 List of educational institutions named after presidents of the United States

References

External links
 

Lists of things named after politicians
Things